Postage stamps have been issued in the Turks and Caicos Islands since 1867.

Turks Islands 
The first stamp of the Turks Islands was issued on 4 April 1867 and was the one penny red. The stamp was reissued numerous times, surcharged to create new values between 1/2 penny and 4 pence.

Turks and Caicos Islands 
The first stamp of the Turks and Caicos Islands were issued on 10 November 1900.

Crown colony 
The islands became a Crown Colony in 1962 and the first stamps issued under the new status were the Freedom from Hunger omnibus issue of 4 June 1963.

Caicos Islands 
From 1981 to 1985 overprinted stamps marked Caicos Islands were issued but they are of doubtful validity.

See also 
Revenue stamps of the Turks and Caicos Islands

References

Further reading 
Bacon, Edward Denny. The Postage Stamps of the Turks Islands. London: Stanley Gibbons, 1917 29p. Supplement 1936 12p.
 Challis, John J. Turks Islands and Caicos Islands to 1950: Postage Stamps, Postal Stationery, Postal History. Harrogate: Roses Caribbean Philatelic Society, 1983 118p. Series Title: Roses Caribbean philatelic handbook; no. 6.
 Proud, Edward B. The Postal History of the Cayman Islands and Turks & Caicos Islands. Heathfield, East Sussex: Proud Publications, 2006  152p.

External links

Identifying King George VI Stamps of the Turks & Caicos Islands.
Stamps at the Turks and Caicos National Museum
Turks and Caicos Islands Philatelic Bureau.
Turks and Caicos Islands stamps 1946-2006 comparative Scott and SG numbers.

Philately of the Turks and Caicos Islands